The Tocantins vesper mouse (Calomys tocantinsi) is a South American rodent species of the family Cricetidae. It is found in Brazil. Its karyotype has 2n = 46 and FNa = 66.

References

Calomys
Mammals described in 2003